Massachusetts House of Representatives' 8th Suffolk district in the United States is one of 160 legislative districts included in the lower house of the Massachusetts General Court. It covers part of Cambridge in Middlesex County and part of Boston in Suffolk County. Democrat Jay Livingstone of Back Bay has represented the district since 2013.

The current district geographic boundary overlaps with those of the Massachusetts Senate's Middlesex and Suffolk district, 1st Suffolk and Middlesex district, and 2nd Suffolk and Middlesex district.

Representatives
 Otis Rich, circa 1858 
 George F. Williams, circa 1858 
 Thomas H. Bussell, circa 1859 
 George A. Shaw, circa 1859 
 Harrison H. Atwood, circa 1888 
 Edward J. Donovan, circa 1888 
 James Melville Hunnewell, circa 1920 
 Henry Lee Shattuck, circa 1920 
 Charles Iannello, circa 1951 
 Michael F. Flaherty, circa 1975 
 Paul C. Demakis, 1995-2005 
 Martha M. Walz, January 2005 – February 2013
 Jay D. Livingstone, 2013-current

See also
 List of Massachusetts House of Representatives elections
 Other Suffolk County districts of the Massachusetts House of Representatives: 1st, 2nd, 3rd, 4th, 5th, 6th, 7th,  9th, 10th, 11th, 12th, 13th, 14th, 15th, 16th, 17th, 18th, 19th
 List of Massachusetts General Courts
 List of former districts of the Massachusetts House of Representatives

Images
Portraits of legislators

References

External links
 Ballotpedia
  (State House district information based on U.S. Census Bureau's American Community Survey).
 League of Women Voters of Boston

House
Government of Suffolk County, Massachusetts
Government of Middlesex County, Massachusetts